Johnny McCreedy (March 23, 1911 – December 7, 1979) was a Canadian ice hockey player who played 64 games in the National Hockey League with the Toronto Maple Leafs and was a member of two Stanley Cup-winning teams, in 1942 and 1945. Internationally he played for the Canadian national team at the 1939 World Championships, winning a gold medal.

Career
McCreedy was born in Winnipeg, Manitoba and raised in Kirkland Lake, Ontario. He later moved back to Winnipeg to begin his career. He became a dominant player on his hometown Winnipeg Monarchs where he won the MJHL and then the 1937 Memorial Cup where he scored four goals in the championship game. He then went to British Columbia to play for the Trail Smoke Eaters, eventually going back to Kirkland Lake to play there and then east to Nova Scotia to play for the Sydney Millionaires. He became a star player for each team and won the Allan Cup with Trail and Kirkland Lake. He also won gold with the Canadian national team at the 1939 World Championships.

McCreedy joined the NHL's Toronto Maple Leafs during the 1941–42 NHL season where he became a solid goal scorer and player scoring 15 goals and 8 assists for 23 points in 47 games. In the playoffs, he scored 4 goals and 3 assists for 7 points in 13 games as the Leafs won the 1942 Stanley Cup after being down 3 games to none in the final.

After his cup win, McCreedy served in World War II for the Royal Canadian Air Force. When he returned to the Leafs in 1945, his numbers failed to match that of his first season scoring just 2 goals and 4 assists for 6 points in 17 games in the regular season and no points in 8 playoff games. However, he once again won the Stanley Cup and then retired from hockey after the win in 1945 at the age of 34.

Post career
McCreedy settled in Sudbury, Ontario where he went on to pursue a career at INCO and was eventually promoted to vice-Chairman. He died due to cancer on December 7, 1979 at the age of 68.

Career statistics

Regular season and playoffs

International

Awards and achievements
Turnbull Cup MJHL Championship (1937)
Memorial Cup Championship (1937)
Allan Cup Championships (1938 & 1940)
World Championship Gold Medalist (1939)
Stanley Cup Championships (1942 & 1945)
Inducted into the Manitoba Sports Hall of Fame and Museum in 2004
Honoured Member of the Manitoba Hockey Hall of Fame

References

External links
 

1917 births
1979 deaths
Canadian ice hockey right wingers
Canadian people of Irish descent
Ice hockey people from Ontario
Ice hockey people from Winnipeg
Ontario Hockey Association Senior A League (1890–1979) players
Sportspeople from Kirkland Lake
Stanley Cup champions
Toronto Maple Leafs players
Winnipeg Monarchs players